The 2022 South American Under-23 Championships in Athletics was the tenth edition of the biennial track and field competition for South American athletes aged under 23 years old, organised by Atletismo Sudamericano.

Medal summary

Men

Women

Mixed

Medal table

Participation

References

2018
South American Under-23 Championships in Athletics
South American Under-23 Championships in Athletics
South American Under-23 Championships in Athletics
Cascavel
International athletics competitions hosted by Brazil
South American Under-23 Championships in Athletics